Rój is a district in the south-west of Żory, Silesian Voivodeship, southern Poland.

The medieval name Ray, denoted a paradise, it was later pronounced by locals (see Silesian dialects) as Roj, which later transformed into Rój, literally a swarm of bees.

History 
The village was first mentioned in a Latin document of Diocese of Wrocław called Liber fundationis episcopatus Vratislaviensis from around 1305 as item in Regno Dei id est Ray ex ordinacione datur ferto singulis annis.

After World War I in the Upper Silesia plebiscite 335 out of 375 voters in Rój voted in favour of joining Poland, against 40 opting for staying in Germany.

In years 1945-1954 the village was a part of gmina Boguszowice.

References

Neighbourhoods in Silesian Voivodeship
Żory